= Devsade =

Village in Maharashtra

- Village
- Interactive map of Devsade
- Coordinates: 17°43′57″N 73°21′09″E
- Country: India
- State: Maharashtra

Devsade is a small village in Ratnagiri district, Maharashtra state in Western India. The 2011 Census of India recorded a total of 415 residents in the village. Devsade's geographical area is approximately 326 hectares (810 acres).
